Gransherad Station was a railway station serving Gransherad in Notodden, Norway on the Tinnoset Line from 1909 to the line closed in 1991.

Designed by Thorvald Astrup it opened on 9 August 1909 as Gransherred. It got the current name on 1 January 1922, but downgraded to a stop on 10 June 1968. NSB contracted the razing of the building, but the entrepreneur liked the building so much he instead moved it to his home village of Hørte in 1986. The station was closed along with the railway on 1 January 1991.

References

External links
 Norwegian Railway Club entry

Railway stations on the Tinnoset Line
Railway stations in Notodden
Railway stations opened in 1914
Railway stations closed in 1991
Disused railway stations in Norway
1914 establishments in Norway
1991 disestablishments in Norway